Gries is the 5th District of the Austrian city of Graz. It is the location of Graz's red-light district.